Henry Potts (1810 – 22 March 1884) was an English farmer, steeplechase rider, High Sheriff of Flintshire and Denbighshire, and cricketer with amateur status who was active in 1831. He was born and died in Chester.

Cricket career
He made his first-class debut in 1831 and appeared in one match as an unknown handedness batsman whose bowling style is unknown, playing for Cambridge University. He scored no runs with a highest score of 0 and took no wickets. 
Potts was educated at Shrewsbury School and Magdalene College, Cambridge.

Steeplechasing
In 1837 Potts rode at the Aintree races, which included a mount on The Duke in the Grand Liverpool Steeplechase, a precursor to the Grand National. Potts won the race but never again took part in the race.

After Sport
In later years he was High Sheriff of Flintshire in 1852 and High Sheriff of Denbighshire in 1877.

References

1810 births
1884 deaths
English cricketers
English cricketers of 1826 to 1863
Cambridge University cricketers
People educated at Shrewsbury School
Alumni of Magdalene College, Cambridge
High Sheriffs of Flintshire
High Sheriffs of Denbighshire